Svetla is a feminine given name. It may refer to:

Svetla Bozhkova (born 1951), retired female discus thrower, who competed for Bulgaria at two Summer Olympics: 1972 and 1980
Svetla Dimitrova (born 1970), Bulgarian athlete who started out competing in heptathlon, and later specialized as a sprint hurdler
Svetla Mitkova-Sınırtaş (born 1964), retired athlete who competed in shot put and discus throw
Svetla Protich (born 1939), Bulgarian classical pianist and professor of music
Svetla Zlateva (born 1952), retired Bulgarian sprinter and middle distance runner who specialized in the 400 and 800 metres

See also
 Světlá, village and municipality (obec) in Blansko District in the South Moravian Region of the Czech Republic

Bulgarian feminine given names